Joyce Fox is a Christian fiction author. She authored Slave to Grace, published in 2013 by DocUmeant Publishing and numerous articles published in various periodicals. She has lived in Michigan, Ohio, Indiana, Illinois, Tennessee, North Carolina, and Arkansas. Fox was awarded the Michigan People's Choice Award for Favorite Reporter in the Capital City Area by Lansing Community Newspapers.

Work
She worked as a reporter and wrote multiple articles for the Grundy County Herald of Tracy City, Tennessee (2000); the Southwest Times Record of Fort Smith, Arkansas (2001); the Holt Community Paper of Holt, Michigan (2001-2002); the Breese Journal of Breese, Illinois (2002- 2005) and the Macomb Journal (later called the McDonough County Voice) of Macomb, Illinois (2006 -2007).

Some of her articles are: " 'Between Friends' Robbery nets Jail, Trial for Two Centralians" (Breese paper); "Man faces prison in new burlgary charges" (Macomb Journal); "Former Mater Dei Educator, Coach Declares for New 107th House District" (Breese paper);  a regular humor column in the Breese Journal called, "With a Little Help..."; "Making Christ Known by Making a Difference" one of the Preacher Features in the Macomb Journal.

Joyce is retired from TriStates Public Radio WIUM/WIUW of Macomb, Illinois, and has spent many years working as a volunteer with the Salvation Army. Joyce now resides in Cleveland, Tennessee. where she is currently studying for licensure in clinical mental health at the Pentecostal Theological Seminary.

Published works 
Slave to Grace published by DocUmeant Publishing
Grace Upon Grace published by DocUmeant Publishing

Published in publications 
War Cry magazine 
Cleveland Daily Banner; Lifestlyles 4 April 2013  
Southwest Times Record
Newspapers in Tennessee, Arkansas, Michigan and Illinois

Awards 
Michigan People's Choice Award for Favorite Reporter in the Capital City Area

References

External links 
   Author's website

Living people
American Christian writers
Christian novelists
Date of birth missing (living people)
American historical fiction writers
American historical novelists
Women historical novelists
American women non-fiction writers
Year of birth missing (living people)
21st-century American women